In mathematics, specifically group theory, finite groups of prime power order , for a fixed prime number  and varying integer exponents , are briefly called finite p-groups.

The p-group generation algorithm by M. F. Newman

and E. A. O'Brien

is a recursive process for constructing the descendant tree
of an assigned finite p-group which is taken as the root of the tree.

Lower exponent-p central series
For a finite p-group , the lower exponent-p central series (briefly lower p-central series) of 
defined recursively by

Since any non-trivial finite p-group  is nilpotent,
there exists an integer  such that 
Only the trivial group  has .
Generally, for any finite p-group ,

,

For the convenience of the reader and for pointing out the shifted numeration, we recall that
defined recursively by

As above, for any non-trivial finite p-group ,
there exists an integer  such that 
Only the trivial group  has .

,

The following Rules should be remembered for the exponent-p class:

Let  be a finite p-group.

 Rule: If , for some group , then , for any .
 Rule: For any , the conditions  and  imply .
 Rule: Let . If , then , for all , in particular, for all .

Parents and descendant trees
The parent  of a finite non-trivial p-group  with exponent-p class 

A descendant tree is a hierarchical structure
for visualizing parent-descendant relations
between isomorphism classes of finite p-groups.
The vertices of a descendant tree are isomorphism classes of finite p-groups.
However, a vertex will always be labelled by selecting a representative of the corresponding isomorphism class.
Whenever a vertex  is the parent of a vertex 
a directed edge of the descendant tree is defined by 
in the direction of the canonical projection  onto the quotient .

In a descendant tree, the concepts of parents and immediate descendants can be generalized.
A vertex  is a descendant of a vertex ,
if either  is equal to 
or there is a path

, where ,

, where .

They can also be viewed as the successive quotients  of p-class  of 

, where .

In particular, every non-trivial finite p-group  defines a maximal path (consisting of  edges)

ending in the trivial group .

The maximal possible descendant tree  of the trivial group  contains all finite p-groups and is exceptional,
since the trivial group  has all the infinitely many elementary abelian p-groups with varying generator rank  as its immediate descendants.
However, any non-trivial finite p-group (of order divisible by ) possesses only finitely many immediate descendants.

p-covering group, p-multiplicator and nucleus
Let  be a finite p-group with  generators.
It turns out that all immediate descendants can be obtained as quotients of a certain extension  of 

,

.

,

and the exact sequence

We call

Let us assume now that the assigned finite p-group  is of p-class .
Then the conditions  and  imply , according to the rule (R3),

as a subgroup of the p-multiplicator.
Consequently, the nuclear rankof  is bounded from above by the p-multiplicator rank.

Allowable subgroups of the p-multiplicator
As before, let  be a finite p-group with  generators.Proposition.Any p-elementary abelian central extension

of 
by a p-elementary abelian subgroup  such that 

For the proof click show on the right hand side.

The reason is that, since , there exists an epimorphism  such that
, where  denotes the canonical projection.
Consequently, we have

and thus .
Further, since  is p-elementary,
Together this shows that 
and thus  induces the desired epimorphism 
such that .

since

An equivalent characterization is that  is a proper subgroup which supplements the nucleus.

where .
However, in general the list

,

where ,
will be redundant,
due to isomorphisms  among the immediate descendants.

Orbits under extended automorphisms

and thus induces an automorphism  of 

Since ,
each extended automorphism  induces a permutation  of the allowable subgroups .
Then the map ,  is an epimorphism
and the equivalence classes of allowable subgroups  are precisely the orbits of allowable subgroups under the action of the permutation group .

Eventually, our goal to compile a list  of all immediate descendants of  will be done,
This is precisely what the p-group generation algorithm does in a single step of the recursive procedure for constructing the descendant tree of an assigned root.

Capable p-groups and step sizes
A finite p-group  is called capable (or extendable) if it possesses at least one immediate descendant, otherwise it is terminal (or a leaf). The nuclear rank  of  admits a decision about the capability of :
  is terminal if and only if .
  is capable if and only if .
In the case of capability,  has immediate descendants of  different step sizes , in dependence on the index  of the corresponding allowable subgroup  in the p-multiplicator . When  is of order , then an immediate descendant of step size  is of order  .

For the related phenomenon of multifurcation of a descendant tree at a vertex  with nuclear rank  see the article on descendant trees.

The p-group generation algorithm provides the flexibility to restrict the construction of immediate descendants to those of a single fixed step size , which is very convenient in the case of huge descendant numbers (see the next section).

Numbers of immediate descendants
Then we have .
As concrete examples, we present some interesting finite metabelian p-groups with extensive sets of immediate descendants, using the SmallGroups identifiers and additionally pointing out the numbers  of capable immediate descendants in the usual format  as given by actual implementations of the p''-group generation algorithm in the computer algebra systems GAP and MAGMA.

First, let .

We begin with groups having abelianization of type .
See Figure 4 in the article on descendant trees.
 The group  of coclass  has ranks ,  and descendant numbers , .
 The group  of coclass  has ranks ,  and descendant numbers , .
 One of its immediate descendants, the group , has ranks ,  and descendant numbers , .

In contrast, groups with abelianization of type  are partially located beyond the limit of computability.
 The group  of coclass  has ranks ,  and descendant numbers , .
 The group  of coclass  has ranks ,  and descendant numbers ,  unknown.
 The group  of coclass  has ranks ,  and descendant numbers ,  unknown.

Next, let .

 The group  of coclass  has ranks ,  and descendant numbers , .
 The group  of coclass  has ranks ,  and descendant numbers , .

Schur multiplier
Via the isomorphism , 
the quotient group 
can be viewed as the additive analogue of the multiplicative group  of all roots of unity.

Let  be a prime number and  be a finite p-group with presentation  as in the previous section.
Then the second cohomology group  of the -module 
It can also be interpreted as the quotient group .

I. R. Shafarevich
has proved that the difference between the relation rank  of 

N. Boston and H. Nover
have shown that ,
of a pro-p group  with finite abelianization .

Furthermore, J. Blackhurst (in the appendix On the nucleus of certain p-groups of a paper by N. Boston, M. R. Bush and F. Hajir
)
has proved that a non-cyclic finite p-group  with trivial Schur multiplier 
is a terminal vertex in the descendant tree  of the trivial group ,
that is,   .

Examples
 A finite p-group  has a balanced presentation  if and only if , that is, if and only if its Schur multiplier  is trivial. Such a group is called a Schur group and it must be a leaf in the descendant tree .
A finite p''-group  satisfies  if and only if , that is, if and only if it has a non-trivial cyclic Schur multiplier . Such a group is called a Schur+1 group.

References

Group theory
P-groups